Chavinziphius is an extinct genus of ziphiid cetacean known from Messinian age marine deposits in the Pisco Formation in Peru. There is only one known species, Chavinziphius maxillocristatus.

References

Ziphiids
Prehistoric cetacean genera
Miocene cetaceans
Fossils of Peru